Dance/movement therapy (DMT) in USA/ Australia or dance movement psychotherapy (DMP) in the UK is the psychotherapeutic use of movement and dance to support intellectual, emotional, and motor functions of the body. As a modality of the creative arts therapies, DMT looks at the correlation between movement and emotion.

History 
The American Dance Therapy Association was founded in 1966 as an organization to support the emerging profession of dance/movement therapy and is the only U.S. organization dedicated to the profession of dance/movement therapy.

Dance has been used therapeutically for thousands of years. It has been used as a healing ritual in the influence of fertility, birth, sickness, and death since early human history. Over the period from 1840 to 1930, a new philosophy of dance developed in Europe and the United States, defined by the idea that movement could have an effect on the mover vis-a-vis that dance was not simply an expressive art. There is a general opinion that Dance/movement as active imagination was originated by Jung in 1916, developed in the 1960s by dance therapy pioneer Mary Whitehouse. Tina Keller-Jenny and other therapists started practicing the therapy in 1940. The actual establishment of dance as a therapy and as a profession occurred in the 1950s, beginning with future American Dance Therapy Association founder Marian Chace.

First wave 
Marian Chace spearheaded the movement of dance in the medical community as a form of therapy. 
She is considered the principal founder of what is now dance therapy in the United States. In 1942, through her work, dance was first introduced to western medicine. Chace was originally a dancer, choreographer, and performer. After opening her own dance school in Washington, D.C., Chace began to realize the effects dance and movement had on her students. The reported feelings of wellbeing from her students began to attract the attention of the medical community, and some local doctors began sending patients to her classes. She was soon asked to work at St. Elizabeth's Hospital in Washington, D.C. once psychiatrists too realized the benefits their patients were receiving from attending Chace's dance classes. In 1966 Chace became the first president of the American Dance Therapy Association, an organization which she and several other DMT pioneers founded. According to the ADTA, dance is "the psychotherapeutic use of movement as a process which furthers the emotional, social, cognitive, and physical integration of the individual."

Second wave 
The second wave of Dance Movement Therapy came around the 1970s to the 1980s and it sparked much interest from American therapists. During this time, therapists began to experiment with the psychotherapeutic applications of dance and movement. As a result of the therapists' experiments, DMT was then categorized as a form of psychotherapy. It was from this second wave that today's Dance Movement Therapy evolved.

Principles 
The theory of DMT is based mainly upon the belief that body and mind interact. Both conscious and unconscious movement of the person, based on the dualist mind body premise, affects total control, and also reflects the individual's personality. Therefore, the therapist-client relationship is partly based on non-verbal cues such as body language. Movement is believed to have a symbolic function and as such can aid in understanding the self. Movement improvisation allows the client to experiment with new ways of being and DMT provides a manner or channel in which the client can consciously understand early relationships with negative experiences through non-verbal mediation by the therapist.

Through the unity of the body, mind, and spirit, DMT provides a sense of wholeness to all individuals. The body refers to the "discharging of energy through muscular-skeletal responses to stimuli received by the brain." The mind refers to "mental activities...such as memory, imagery, perception, attention, evaluation, reasoning and decision making." The spirit refers to the "subjectively experienced feeling of engaging in or empathically observing dancing."

Dance movement therapy works to improve the social skills, as well as relational dynamics among the clients that choose to participate in it to better improve their quality of life. Through this form of therapy clients will gain a deeper sense of self-awareness through a meditative process that involves movement, motion, and realization of one's body. Dance therapy is different from other forms of rehabilitative treatments because it allows holistic creative expression, meaning it treats the full person: mind, body, and spirit.

Methodology 
DMT/P methodology is fairly heterogenous and practitioners draw on a variety of psychotherapeutic and kinetic principles. Most training in Dance Movement Therapy will have an established theoretical base which they work from – for example Psychodynamic theory, Humanistic psychology, Integrative therapy, Cognitive behavioral therapy, Existential therapy etc. Depending on the approach or combinations of approaches practitioners work from very different processes and aims will be worked towards.

Additionally to the psychotherapeutic basis of their work, different approaches to movement and dance may be employed.

Whilst some dance therapists work with codified dance movement and styles – such as ballet, folk dance, contemporary dance etc. – most work within a kinetic framework of creative and expressive movement practices, usually with a significant element of structured improvisation.

Commonly requirements on mosts DMT/P graduate programmes are Movement Analysis and Profiling (often based in Laban movement analysis and the Kerstenberg Movement Profile), experiential anatomy, human development and Developmental psychology, Authentic Movement and supplementary body-mind integration practices, such as Body-Mind Centering, Bartenieff Fundamentals, Feldenkrais Method or Alexander Technique.

Additionally since a variety of populations may be encountered in DMT/P, methods are adapted to meet the needs of the circumstances and clients and this further reduces standardisation.

Bonnie Meekums, a second wave dance therapist, described four stages of the therapy process, based on her experience in the field:

 Preparation: the warm-up stage, a safe space is established without obstacles nor distractions, a supportive relationship with a witness is formed, comfort for participants to be familiar with moving with their eyes closed.

 Incubation: leader verbally prompts participant to go into subconscious, open-ended imagery used to create an internal environment that is catered to the participant, relaxed atmosphere, symbolic movements.

 Illumination: process which is integrated through conscious awareness via dialogue with witness, self-reflection in which the participant uncovers and resolves subconscious motivations, increased self awareness, can have positive and negative effects.

 Evaluation: discuss insights and significance of the process, prepare to end therapy

The use of props 
Dance movement therapists often use props during sessions with clients to help them with grounding skills and to become more aware of their body and boundaries. Such props could include blankets, sensory balls, sensory weighted blankets, colourful scarfs, colouring pencils and resistance bands. Clients often get to choose the type of music they would like to use in a session.

Research 
Dance movement therapy is not an established field of medical practice and deals with varying degrees of acceptance and recognition in different countries. In countries where a Master level of education is required, dance therapists often work within medical or psychiatric settings alongside other healthcare professionals, whereas in other countries the practice of dance therapy is fringe and mainly occurs in private and independent settings.

For this reason, scientific research into the mechanisms and efficacy of dance therapy is still in its infancy. Additionally, since the practice of dance therapy is heterogenous and the scope and methodology varies greatly, this makes it even harder to create medically rigorous evidence bases. However, studies exist which suggest positive outcomes of dance therapy.

Proposed mechanisms 
Various hypothesis have been proposed for mechanisms by which dance therapy may benefit participants. There is a social component to dance therapy, which can be valuable for psychological functioning through human interaction. Another possible mechanism is the music that is used during the session, which may be able to reduce pain, decrease anxiety, and increase relaxation. Since dance requires learning and involves becoming active and discovering capacities for movement, there is also the physical training that could provide benefits as well. Dancing may be considered more uplifting and enjoyable than other types of exercise. Dance therapy can also involve nonverbal communication, "which enables participants to express their feelings without words. This might be helpful when normal communication is absent or has broken down (eg, for patients with dementia)."

Studies 
A Cochrane review entitled Dance therapy for schizophrenia in 2013 concluded:

A review by the Cochrane Collaboration entitled Dance/movement therapy for cancer patients was updated in January 2015 to say:

The most recent Cochrane review for DMT was in February 2015 entitled Is dance movement therapy an effective treatment for depression? A review of the evidence. The findings stated:

One review of the effect of DMT on Parkinson's disease noted that there have been few studies in this area. DMT appears to meet most requirements for exercise programs for patient's with Parkinson's. Benefits in gait function, balance, and quality of life were found in short-term studies, though further studies need to be done to see if any of these benefits are seen long-term.

The latest Cochrane review entitled Dance Movement Therapy for Dementia published in 2017 concluded that there we no high quality trials to assess the effect of DMT on behavioural, social, cognitive and emotional symptoms in people with dementia.

Benefits 

Research has found that using dance movements as a form of therapy activates several brain functions at once: kinesthetic, rational, musical, and emotional. This type of movement requires mental, physical, and emotional strength to work simultaneously. In one research study, senior citizens were placed in a 21-year study to see if any physical or cognitive recreational activity influenced mental acuity.  Researchers monitored rates of dementia in the elderly participants. The study included cognitive activities such as reading books, doing crossword puzzles, and playing musical instruments and physical activities such as golf, walking for exercise, and dancing. Results showed that almost none of the physical activities appeared to offer any defense against dementia. The activity with the highest percentage of protection against dementia was dancing frequently (76%). It was the greatest risk reduction of any activity studied, cognitive or physical. This is because dance therapy combines multiple areas of the brain to work together at once rather than just stimulating one area at a time.

Dance movement therapy is found to have beneficial results on children who have been abused. Research has found that this therapy is a useful form of support and intervention for these children. Through a case study with a sexually abused female, the researcher stated that the individual felt a sense of empowerment after the dance therapy sessions and reported greater success in school. The individual also felt a stronger sense of self-confidence and a higher view of self-esteem. The study states that using dance therapy would be a beneficial experience in a multi-disciplinary treatment for abused and neglected children.

Another researcher studied the effects of dance therapy with children at risk of abuse and their relationship with their mothers. During this study, mothers and their children were surveyed on their relationship prior to the session, asking questions regarding their communication, physical touch, and sense of security felt by the child. After the dance therapy session, the participants were surveyed again with the same measure. The results reported a stronger bond between mother and child. The participants reported a stronger sense of belonging in the pair and felt more openness in terms of communication. Through dance therapy practices, these mother and daughter pairs were able to develop a starting point in rebuilding their relationship.

The effects of dance intervention were also found to be therapeutic to psychiatric participants and those who are emotional disturbed. In one research study, psychiatric patients were randomly assigned to one of three conditions: a dance group in a traditional dance circle, a group that just listened to the music, and another group that rode stationary bikes without music but same time duration as the dance circle. While all three conditions lessened or stabilized the condition of the patients, the results found that the dance group benefitted the most from the dance intervention. The dance circle group reported less depression and more vitality than the other groups. This study shows that not just physical activity or listening to music is enough; the combining of the two into dance is the most beneficial for achieving a positive impact.

Another research study completed with children in psychiatry also showed a positive relationship with this type of therapy. The ending result was a newfound cohesion among children who were previously labeled disorderly and misbehaved. The participants reported an increase in self-confidence and a positive body image after the dance intervention. The children had stronger communication and social skills, such as team work, after the dance intervention.

Adverse effects 

Most trials studying dance movement therapy did not specifically comment on whether or not adverse effects occurred.

Locations 
DMT is practiced in a large variety of locations. Such locations include:
 Physical medicine
 Rehabilitation centers
 Medical settings
 Education school facilities 
 Nursing Homes
 Day care facilities
 Disease prevention centers
 Health promotion programs
 Hospitals
 Mental health settings
 Private practice

Organizations 
Organizations such as the American Dance Therapy Association were created in order to uphold high standards in the field of DMT. Such organizations help connect individuals to therapists and DMT.

American Dance Therapy Association 
American Dance Therapy Association (ADTA) was founded in 1966 in order to uphold high standards throughout dance therapy. The ADTA was created by Marian Chace, the first president of the ADTA, and other pioneers in dance movement. Along with setting standards for which therapists must attain to become licensed therapists, ADTA keeps an updated registry of all movement/dance therapists who have met ADTA's standards. In addition, ADTA also publishes the American Journal of Dance Therapy and sponsors annual professional conferences. According to the ADTA, movement is considered to be a language which allows our body. mind, and spirit to communicate. There are recorded webinars that you can watch at any point in time that can educate and give you more knowledge about the dance therapy field. Along with this, there are also live webinars that you can purchase which allow you to receive a deeper education about how you can use dance therapy in your daily life.

Association for Dance Movement Psychotherapy, United Kingdom 
The Association for Dance Movement Psychotherapy, United Kingdom (ADMP UK) was one of the first organizations established to regulate the field of dance therapy. ADMP UK accredits therapists and oversees that all regulations are followed. This association is working vigorously to promote dance throughout the UK and other countries, as well as collaborating with other art therapy organizations. The ADMP UK is providing dance therapy to the community which can be done individually or in group sessions.  They use Dance Movement Psychotherapy (DMP), which explains how body movement is a key instrument of expression and communication, throughout these sessions. DMP can support trust within the relationships in your life, the potential for you to physically and spiritually grow within yourself, and the discovery of who you truly are.

European Association of Dance Movement Therapy 
The European Association of Dance Movement Therapy is an umbrella association which represents national professional bodies for Dance Movement Therapy in Europe. It represents members in Germany, Greece, Hungary, Italy, Latvia, Netherlands, Poland, Russia, Spain and the UK; with partial members in Austria, Czech Republic, Finland, France, Switzerland, Ukraine and associate members in Croatia, Cyprus, Denmark, Israel, Portugal, Romania and Sweden. Their mission statement is to work extremely hard to continue the development of dance therapy and the legal recognition of this practice. This association aims to exchange ideas and collaborate with other countries about dance therapy.

NVDAT (Nederlandse Vereniging voor Danstherapie-Dutch Dance Movement Therapy Association)
The Nederlandse Vereniging voor Danstherapie supports the interests of dance movement therapists based in The Netherlands.

Allied professions 
Allied professions are areas that a person could do, special studies, short courses, or eventually become trained in the area of DMT.
 Dance
 Physical education
 Occupational therapy
 Physiotherapy
 Psychology
 Art therapy

Therapist qualifications 
ADTA is the main regulator of the required education and training in order to become a dance/movement therapist in the USA. A master's degree is required to become a dance/movement therapist. "Registered Dance/Movement Therapist" (R-DMT) is the title given to entry-level dance/movement therapists who have completed requisite education and a minimum 700-hour supervised clinical internship. Those who have completed over 2400 hours of supervised professional clinical work may apply for
 the advanced credential "Board Certified Dance/Movement Therapist (BC-DMT).

Education 
Typically becoming a dance therapist requires a graduate degree of at least a Master's level. There is no specific undergraduate degree, however many practitioners hold undergraduate degrees fields in, or related to, psychology or dance.

All master's degrees in the UK and the USA require clinical placements, personal therapy and supervision, as well as experiential and theoretical learning, and typically require between 2 and 3 years to complete. Upon completion of a Masters graduates are eligible to register as Dance Movement Therapists/Psychotherapists with their professional associations. In the UK graduates may also register with the UK Council of Psychotherapists(UKCP).

It is also possible to register as a Dance Movement Therapist/Psychotherapist without a DMT/DMP Masters. This usually requires equilvilant psychotherapeutic training and substantial experience of applying dance into therapeutic settings.

See also 
 Expressive therapy
 Process art
 Rudolf Laban

References

Further reading 
 Meekums, B. (2002). Dance Movement Therapy: a Creative Psychotherapeutic Approach. London: Sage.
 Chodorow, J. (1991). Dance Therapy and Depth Psychology. London.
 Lewis, P. (1984; 1986). Theoretical Approaches in Dance Movement Therapy. Vols I & II, USA: Kendall/Hunt.
 Payne, H. (ed). (2006). Dance Movement Therapy: Theory, Research and Practice (2nd edn). Tavistock / Routledge.
 Siegel, E. (1984). Dance Movement Therapy: Mirror of Ourselves: The Psychoanalytic Approach. New York: Human Science Press.
 Stanton-Jones, K. (1992). An Introduction to Dance Movement Therapy in Psychiatry. London: Tavistock/Routledge.
 North, M. (1990). Personality Assessment Through Movement. Northcote House.
 Payne, H.L. (2000). Creative Movement and Dance in Groupwork. Oxon: Speechmark.

External links

The Association for Dance Movement Therapy in UK
American Dance Therapy Association
Coalition of Creative Arts Therapy Associations
European Association of Dance Movement Therapy

 
Body psychotherapy
Creative arts therapies
Dance occupations
Therapy